Bradoriids are an extinct order of small marine arthropods with a bivalved carapace, and were globally distributed, forming a significant portion of the Cambrian and Early Ordovician soft-bodied communities.

Affinity 
Whilst the Bradoriida were traditionally considered as relatives of the modern bivalved arthropod group Ostracoda, the anatomy of their appendages does not support such a relationship; neither are they related to the Cambrian bivalved arthropod group Phosphatocopida. Rather, they are most probably related to the Eucrustacea at a stem-group level.

An in-depth phylogenetic analysis of Panarthropoda included two bradoriid genera, Kunyangella and Kunmingella, and recovered them as the most basal stem-mandibulates.

Occurrence 
Bradoriida are geographically widespread, and first occur in the fossil record shortly before the earliest trilobite fossils. Their taxonomic composition broadly reflects two geographical provinces ("European" and "4A", i.e. America, Asia, Australia, Antarctica) which approximately mirror trilobite provinces, with the 4A area representing warmer waters closer to the palaeoequator. Bradoriid diversity was highest along the coasts of South China and eastern Gondwana (Australia) and was relatively low along the Laurentian coast.

References 

Prehistoric crustaceans
Crustacean orders